Orange is an active commuter railroad train station in the city of Orange, Essex County, New Jersey. One of two stops in the city (along with Highland Avenue), it is served by New Jersey Transit's Morris and Essex Lines: the Morristown Line to Hackettstown and the Gladstone Branch to Gladstone for trains from New York Penn Station and Hoboken Terminal. Orange station contains two low-level side platforms and three tracks. 

Orange station opened on November 19, 1836, with the opening of the Morris and Essex Railroad from Newark to Orange. The station served as the western terminus of the line until September 28, 1837, when the railroad started operations west to Madison station. The current station depots and overhangs were built in 1918 with the elevation of tracks through the city by the Delaware, Lackawanna and Western Railroad. The station depot at Orange station were added to the New Jersey and National Registers of Historic Places in 1984 as part of the Operating Passenger Railroad Stations Thematic Resource.

History 
The brick station and nearby freight terminal were built in 1918. The station building has been listed in the state and federal registers of historic places since 1984 and is part of the Operating Passenger Railroad Stations Thematic Resource.

Station layout
Both platforms have walkways over their respective track allowing passengers to access Track 1, though trains on Track 1 do not typically stop at this station.

See also 
 List of New Jersey Transit stations
 National Register of Historic Places listings in Essex County, New Jersey

Bibliography

References

External links

Orange, New Jersey
NJ Transit Rail Operations stations
Railway stations in Essex County, New Jersey
Railway stations in the United States opened in 1836
Railway stations on the National Register of Historic Places in New Jersey
Former Delaware, Lackawanna and Western Railroad stations
Renaissance Revival architecture in New Jersey
National Register of Historic Places in Essex County, New Jersey
1836 establishments in New Jersey